Wenasoga, also known as Sogie, is an unincorporated community in northern Alcorn County, Mississippi, United States. It is situated northwest of Corinth near the Tennessee border.

A post office operated under the name Wenasoga from 1875 to 1973.

References

Unincorporated communities in Alcorn County, Mississippi
Unincorporated communities in Mississippi